Rameshbabu Praggnanandhaa (born 10 August 2005) is an Indian chess grandmaster. A chess prodigy, he earned the international master title at the age of 10, the youngest at the time to do so, and the Grandmaster title at age 12, the second-youngest at the time to do so. On 22 February 2022, at the age of 16, he became the youngest player till then to defeat current world champion Magnus Carlsen, when he beat Carlsen in a rapid game at the Airthings Masters Rapid Chess Tournament. (Gukesh D is now holding the record since 16 October 2022)

Chess career
Praggnanandhaa won the World Youth Chess Championship Under-8 title in 2013, earning him the title of FIDE Master at the age of 7. He won the Under-10 title in 2015.

In 2016, Praggnanandhaa became the youngest international master in history, at the age of 10 years, 10 months, and 19 days. He achieved his first grandmaster norm at the World Junior Chess Championship in November 2017, finishing fourth with 8 points. He gained his second norm at the Heraklion Fischer Memorial GM norm tournament in Greece on 17 April 2018. On 23 June 2018 he achieved his third and final norm at the Gredine Open in Urtijëi, Italy, by defeating Luca Moroni in the eighth round to become, at the age of 12 years, 10 months and 13 days, the then second-youngest person ever to achieve the rank of grandmaster (Sergee Karjakin attained the title at 12 years and 7 months). He is the fifth-youngest person ever to achieve the title of Grandmaster (GM), behind Abhimanyu Mishra, Sergey Karjakin, Gukesh D, and Javokhir Sindarov.

In 2018, Praggnanandhaa was invited to the Magistral de León Masters in Spain for a four-game rapid match against Wesley So. He defeated So in game one, and after three games the score was tied at 1½–1½. In the last game, So defeated Praggnanandhaa, winning the match 2½–1½.

In January 2018, Praggnanandhaa tied for third place with GM Alder Escobar Forero and IM Denys Shmelov in the Charlotte Chess Center's Winter 2018 GM Norm Invitational held in Charlotte, North Carolina, with a score of 5.0/9. 

In July 2019, Praggnanandhaa won the Xtracon Chess Open in Denmark, scoring 8½/10 points (+7–0=3). On 12 October 2019, he won the World Youth Championships in the Under-18 section with a score of 9/11. In December 2019, he became the second-youngest person to achieve a rating of 2600. He did this at the age of 14 years, 3 months and 24 days.

In April 2021, Praggnanandhaa won the Polgar Challenge, the first leg (out of four) of the Julius Baer Challengers Chess Tour, a rapid online event organized by Julius Baer Group and Chess24.com for young talents.  He scored 15.5/19, 1.5 points ahead of the next best placed competitors.  This win helped him qualify for the next Meltwater Champions Chess Tour on 24 April 2021, where he finished in 10th place with a score of 7/15 (+4-5=6), including wins against Teimour Radjabov, Jan-Krzysztof Duda, Sergey Karjakin, and Johan-Sebastian Christiansen as well as a draw against World Champion Magnus Carlsen.

Praggnanandhaa entered the Chess World Cup 2021 as the 90th seed. He defeated GM Gabriel Sargissian 2–0 in round 2, and advanced to round 4 after defeating GM Michał Krasenkow in the rapid tiebreaks in round 3. He was eliminated in round four by Maxime Vachier-Lagrave.

Praggnanandhaa played in the Masters section of the Tata Steel Chess Tournament 2022, winning games against Andrey Esipenko, Vidit Gujrathi and Nils Grandelius, finishing in 12th place with a final score of 5½.

On 20 February 2022, he became the third Indian player (after Anand and Harikrishna) to win a game against World Champion Magnus Carlsen in any time format, in the online Airthings Masters rapid tournament of the Champions Chess Tour 2022, with a 15+10 time control. 

At the Chessable Masters online rapid chess tournament in May 2022, he defeated Carlsen once again, his second win over him in 3 months, and advanced to the finals.

He also defeated Carlsen 3 times in the FTX Crypto Cup 2022, finishing second behind Carlsen in the final standings.

Personal life
Praggnanandhaa was born in Chennai, Tamil Nadu on 10 August 2005. He is the younger sibling of Woman Grandmaster and International Master R Vaishali. His father works as a branch manager at TNSC Bank, and his mother is a homemaker. He studies at Velammal Main Campus in Chennai.

Notes

References

External links

 
 
 
 
 

2005 births
Living people
Chess grandmasters
Indian chess players
Tamil sportspeople
World Youth Chess Champions
Indian sport by year
Recipients of the Arjuna Award